This is a list of the Spanish Singles number-ones of 1982.

Chart history

See also
1982 in music
List of number-one hits (Spain)
List of number-one singles of the 1980s in Spain

References

1982
Spain Singles
Number-one singles